Káptalanfa is a village in Veszprém county, Hungary.

Like all the surrounding villages, Káptalanfa also hold their own 'Village Day'. It contains horse riding, food cooking- and football competitions between local teams. The day ends with a dance.

External links 
 Street map (Hungarian)

Populated places in Veszprém County